Chestatee High School is a public high school located in Gainesville, Georgia, United States, operated by  Hall County Schools. The school was established in 2002 when the enrollment at North Hall High School grew too large. The school serves the communities of Gainesville, Murrayville, and Dawsonville.

Profile 
Chestatee High School is a four-year public high school, one of six high schools serving students in Hall County, Georgia. It serves 1,120 students in grades 9–12. Chestatee Middle School feeds into Chestatee High School.

Demographics
Asian: 1.8%
Black: 1.8%
Hispanic: 39.7%
Native American: 0.3%
White: 55.0% 
Multi-racial: 1.4%

Athletics
Chestatee competes in Sub-Division A of Region 7-AAA. Chestatee fields teams in football, baseball, basketball (boys' and girls'), cheerleading/competition cheerleading, softball, cross country, tennis, track and field, wrestling, soccer (boys' and girls'), and volleyball. The school is a member of the Georgia High School Association.
Chestatee now competes in subdivision A of 8-AAA.

Performing Arts

Drama 
The War Eagle actors won the 2017 GHSA one-act play state championship.

References

External links 
Chestatee High School
Hall County Schools

Educational institutions established in 2002
Schools in Hall County, Georgia
Public high schools in Georgia (U.S. state)
2002 establishments in Georgia (U.S. state)